Lisia Góra  is a village in the administrative district of Gmina Główczyce, within Słupsk County, Pomeranian Voivodeship, in northern Poland.

See also
 History of Pomerania

References

Villages in Słupsk County